Austria competed at the 1988 Winter Paralympics in Innsbruck, Austria. 52 competitors from Austria won 44 medals including 20 gold, 10 silver and 14 bronze and finished 2nd in the medal table.

Alpine skiing 

The medalists are:

  Martina Altenberger, Women's Downhill LW6/8
  Martina Altenberger, Women's Giant Slalom LW6/8
  Martina Altenberger, Women's Slalom LW6/8
  Paul Bluschke, Men's Giant Slalom LW10
  Paul Bluschke, Men's Slalom LW10
  Franz Griessbacher, Men's Downhill B1
  Franz Griessbacher, Men's Giant Slalom B1
  Odo Habermann, Men's Downhill B2
  Odo Habermann, Men's Giant Slalom B2
  Elisabeth Kellner, Women's Downhill B2
  Elisabeth Kellner, Women's Giant Slalom B2
  Elisabeth Maxwald, Women's Giant Slalom B1
  Josef Meusburger, Men's Giant Slalom LW4
  Dietmar Schweninger, Men's Slalom LW6/8
  Meinhard Tatschl, Men's Giant Slalom LW6/8
  Gabriele Berghofer, Women's Giant Slalom B2
  Edith Hoelzl, Women's Downhill B2
  Gerhard Langer, Men's Downhill LW3
  Markus Ramsauer, Men's Giant Slalom LW4
  Gabriele Berghofer, Women's Downhill B2
  Rainer Bergmann, Men's Giant Slalom LW2
  Edith Hoelzl, Women's Giant Slalom B2
  Willi Hohm, Men's Downhill B1
  Gerhard Langer, Men's Giant Slalom LW3
  Gerhard Pscheider, Men's Giant Slalom B2
  Meinhard Tatschl, Men's Downhill LW6/8
  Meinhard Tatschl, Men's Slalom LW6/8

Biathlon 

The medalists are:

  Wolfgang Pickl, Men's 7.5 km LW6/8

Cross-country 

The medalists are:

  Veronika Preining, Women's Short Distance 5 km B1
  Veronika Preining, Renata Hoenisch, Marian Susitz,  Women's 3x5 km Relay B1-3
  Renata Hoenisch, Women's Short Distance 5 km B2
  Veronika Preining, Women's Long Distance 10 km B1
  Hildegard Fetz, Women's Long Distance 5 km grade II
  Hildegard Fetz, Women's Short Distance 2.5 km grade II
  Renata Hoenisch, Women's Long Distance 10 km B2
  Marian Susitz, Women's Short Distance 5 km B2

Ice sledge speed racing 

The medalists are:

  Felix Karl, Men's 100 m grade I
  Felix Karl, Men's 300 m grade I
  Felix Karl, Men's 500 m grade I
  Felix Karl, Men's 700 m grade I
  Josef Greil, Men's 100 m grade I
  Josef Greil, Men's 300 m grade I
  Josef Greil, Men's 500 m grade I
  Josef Greil, Men's 700 m grade I

See also 
 Austria at the Paralympics
 Austria at the 1988 Winter Olympics

References 

Austria at the Paralympics
1988 in Austrian sport
Nations at the 1988 Winter Paralympics